Alice ‘Ally’ Hussey is a former camogie player winner of six All Ireland medals and a Cuchulainn All Star award in 1965.

Career
She first played for Dublin against Wexford in the Lienster championship of 1959, winning All Ireland medals in 1959, 1960, 1961, 1962, 1963, 1964, 1965 and 1966. She retired in 1971. With Celtic, she won the inaugural All Ireland club championship in 1964. She won Dublin championship medals with Celtic in 1961 and 1964 and two Gale Linn interprovincial medals with Leinster.

References

External links
 Camogie.ie Official Camogie Association Website
 Wikipedia List of Camogie players

Year of birth missing (living people)
Living people
Dublin camogie players